Middlesbrough is a town in North Yorkshire, England. It is governed by a unitary authority borough named after the town, which is part of the devolved Tees Valley area. The town is on the southern bank of the River Tees and near the North York Moors National Park. 

Until the early 1800s, the area was rural farming land. By 1830, a new industrial town and port started to be developed, driven by the coal and later ironworks. Steel production and ship building began in the late 1800s, remaining associated with the town until post-industrial decline occurred in the late twentieth century. Trade (notably through ports) and digital enterprise sectors contemporarily contribute to the local economy, Teesside University and Middlesbrough College to local education.

In 1853, it became a town. The motto  ("We shall be" in Latin) was adopted, it reflects  ("We have been") of the Bruce clan which were Cleveland's mediaeval lords. The town's coat of arms is three ships representing shipbuilding and maritime trade and an azure (blue) lion, the latter also from the Bruce clan. In 1889, the North Riding of Yorkshire became an administrative county, the town's municipal borough also became a county borough. From 1968 until 1974, some boroughs and parishes both from the rest of the county and County Durham formed the County Borough of Teesside. A star replaced the middle ship (from Captain James Cook's arms) in the recreated namesake borough's arms, with Cleveland becoming non-metropolitan county in 1974 which was abolished in 1996, leading to its current governance.

At the 2011 census, the Middlesbrough subdivision of the Teesside built-up area had a population of 174,700, the population is larger due to an area outside the council area known as Greater Eston. The built-up area, of which Middlesbrough forms the largest part, had a population of 376,633.

History

Monks and lords
Middlesbrough started as a Benedictine priory on the south bank of the River Tees, its name possibly derived from it being midway between the holy sites of Durham and Whitby. The earliest recorded form of Middlesbrough's name is "Mydilsburgh". The name literally means "middle fortress".

In 686, a monastic cell was consecrated by St. Cuthbert at the request of St. Hilda, Abbess of Whitby. The manor of Middlesburgh belonged to Whitby Abbey and Guisborough Priory. Robert Bruce, Lord of Cleveland and Annandale, granted and confirmed, in 1119, the church of St. Hilda of Middleburg to Whitby. Up until its closure on the Dissolution of the Monasteries by Henry VIII in 1537, the church was maintained by 12 Benedictine monks, many of whom became vicars, or rectors, of various places in Cleveland.

After the Angles, the area became home to Viking settlers. Names of Viking origin (with the suffix  meaning village) are abundant in the area; for example, Ormesby, Stainsby and Tollesby were once separate villages that belonged to Vikings called Orm, Steinn and Toll that are now areas of Middlesbrough were recorded in the Domesday Book of 1086.

Coal and docks
In 1801, Middlesbrough was a small farm with a population of just 25; however, during the latter half of the 19th century, it experienced rapid growth. In 1828 the influential Quaker banker, coal mine owner and Stockton and Darlington Railway (S&DR) shareholder Joseph Pease sailed up the River Tees to find a suitable new site downriver of Stockton on which to place new coal staithes.

Through the company, the investors set about a new coal port development (designed by John Harris) on the southern banks of the Tees. The first coal shipping staithes at the port (known as "Port Darlington") were constructed with a settlement to the east established on the site of Middlesbrough farm as labour for the port, taking on the farm's name as it developed into a village. 

The port was linked to the S&DR on 27 December 1830 via a branch that extended to an area just north of the current  railway station.

The success of the port meant it soon became overwhelmed by the volume of imports and exports, and in 1839 work started on a dock to the east of Middlesbrough. The first water for the dock was let in on 19 March 1842, the formal opening took place on 12 May 1842.

Iron, Steel and ships

Iron dominated the Tees area since 1841 when Henry Bolckow in partnership with John Vaughan, founded the Vulcan iron foundry and rolling mill. Vaughan introduced the new "Bell Hopper" system of closed blast furnaces developed at the Ebbw Vale works. The new system and nearby abundant supply of Ironstone in the Eston Hills in 1850, made the works a success with the area becoming known as the "Iron-smelting centre of the world" and Bolckow, Vaughan & Co., Ltd the largest company in existence at the time.

By 1851 Middlesbrough's population had grown from 40 people in 1829 to 7,600. Pig iron production rose tenfold between 1851 and 1856 and by the mid-1870s Middlesbrough was producing one third of the entire nations Pig Iron output. It was during this time Middlesbrough earned the nickname "Ironopolis".

On 21 January 1853, Middlesbrough received its Royal Charter of Incorporation, giving the town the right to have a mayor, aldermen and councillors. Henry Bolckow became mayor, in 1853.

In the latter half of the 19th century, Old Middlesbrough was starting to decline and was overshadowed by developments built around the new town hall, south of the original town hall.

On 15 August 1867, a Reform Bill was passed, making Middlesbrough a new parliamentary borough, Bolckow was elected member for Middlesbrough the following year. In 1900, Bolckow, Vaughan & Co had become the largest producer of steel in Great Britain.

The town's rapid expansion continued throughout the second half of the 19th century (fuelled by the iron and steel industry), the population reaching 90,000 by the dawn of the 20th century.

Second World War
Middlesbrough was the first major British town and industrial target to be bombed during the Second World War. The steel making capacity and railways for carrying steel products were obvious targets. The Luftwaffe first bombed the town on 25 May 1940, when a lone bomber dropped 13 bombs between South Bank Road and the South Steel plant. More bombing occurred throughout the course of the war, with the railway station put out of action for two weeks in 1942.

By the end of the war over 200 buildings had been damaged or destroyed within the Middlesbrough area. Areas of early and mid-Victorian housing were demolished and much of central Middlesbrough was redeveloped. Heavy industry was relocated to areas of land better suited to the needs of modern technology. Middlesbrough itself began to take on a completely different look.

Post-war rebuild

Post war industrial to contemporary un-industrial Middlesbrough has changed the town, multiple buildings replaced and roads built. The A66 road was built through the town in the 1980s; Middlesbrough's Royal Exchange building was demolished to make way for the road. 

Middlesbrough F.C.'s modern Riverside Stadium opened on 26 August 1995 next to Middlesbrough Dock. The club moved from their previous home in the town for 92 years, Ayresome Park.

The original St.Hilda's area of Middlesbrough, after decades of decline and clearance, was given a new name of Middlehaven in 1986 on investment proposals to build on the land. Middlehaven has since had new buildings built there including Middlesbrough College and Middlesbrough FC's Riverside Stadium amongst others. Also situated at Middlehaven is the "Boho" zone, offering office space to the area's business and to attract new companies, and also "Bohouse", housing. Some of the street names from the original grid-iron street plan of the town still exist in the area today.

The expansion of Middlesbrough southwards, eastwards and westwards continued throughout the 20th century absorbing villages such as Linthorpe, Acklam, Ormesby, Marton and Nunthorpe and continues to the present day.

Governance

Municipal
The area of Yorkshire, where the town is now, was once part of the North Riding and the Langbaurgh Wapentake, the latter also known as Cleveland.

Middlesbrough was incorporated as a town and municipal borough in 1853. It extended its boundaries in 1866 and 1887, becoming a county borough under the Local Government Act 1888. A Middlesbrough Rural District was formed in 1894, covering a rural area to the south of the town. It was abolished in 1932, partly going to the county borough and mostly going to the Stokesley Rural District.

In the latter half of the 20th century Middlesbrough was affected by three reforms: in 1968, Middlesbrough became part of the Teesside County Borough; in 1974, it became the county town of the Cleveland non-metropolitan county until its abolition and in 1996, the Borough of Middlesbrough became a unitary authority of North Yorkshire. In 2011 a local enterprise partnership was formed from the former Cleveland boroughs and the borough of Darlington called Tees Valley, in 2016 the area appointed a combined authority mayor.

Constituencies
They are two constituencies with the town's name in. The Middlesbrough constituency is represented by Andy McDonald for Labour in the House of Commons. He was elected in a by-election held on 29 November 2012 following the death of previous Member of Parliament Sir Stuart Bell, who was the MP since 1983. Middlesbrough has been a traditionally safe Labour seat. The first Conservative MP for Middlesbrough was Sir Samuel Alexander Sadler, elected in 1900.

The Middlesbrough South and East Cleveland constituency is represented by Simon Clarke of the Conservative Party, who won the seat off Labour in the 2017 general election. Prior to Clarke's election, the seat had always been Labour since it was created in 1997.

The area, where the town is now, was formerly represented by multiple different constituencies:
Yorkshire, 1290 - 1832
North Riding of Yorkshire, 1832 - 1885
Middlesbrough, 1868 - 1918
Cleveland, 1885 - 1918
1918–1974,
Cleveland
Middlesbrough East
Middlesbrough West
From 1974,
Cleveland and Whitby, until 1983
Langbaurgh, until 1997
Middlesbrough South and East Cleveland, current
Middlesbrough, current

Geography

Middlesbrough is south of the River Tees with heavy industry and nature reserves on the opposite bank. Some open spaces in the town are off the B1380 road (Ladgate Lane): Sandy Flatts, Middlesbrough Municipal Golf Course, Stewart Park and Ormesby Hall's grounds.

Distance to other places

It is one of the Tree Cities of the World; Bradford, Hull, Leeds and Sheffield also have the title.

Areas

Middlesbrough is within the Teesside built-up area, which is centred around the River Tees; it includes nearby towns such as Stockton and Redcar.

The following list shows the wards that correspond to the Middlesbrough built-up area subdivision; those in bold have correspondingly-named parishes.

Climate
Middlesbrough has an oceanic climate typical for the United Kingdom.
Being sheltered from prevailing south-westerly winds by the Lake District and Pennines to the west, and the Cleveland Hills to the south, Middlesbrough is in one of the relatively dry parts of the country, receiving on average  of rain a year.

Seasonal variations are small and both the mild summers and cool winters are far removed from the average climates of the latitude (54.5°N). This is mainly due to the British Isles being a relatively small land mass surrounded by water, the mild south-westerly Gulf Stream air that dominates the British Isles, and the propensity for cloud cover to limit temperature extremes. In nearby Scandinavia, more than ten latitudes farther north, there are coastal Bothnian climates with warmer summers than Middlesbrough; and winters in Middlesbrough can be less cold than those at lower latitudes in mainland Europe.

Economy

Middlesbrough has four shopping centres accessible from Linthorpe road: Cleveland Centre, Hill Street, Captain Cook Square and Dundas. Gateway Retail Park is near the Riverside Stadium and the Parkway Centre is in Coulby Newham. Cleveland retail park (South Bank) and the retail part of Teesside Park (between Thornaby and Middlesbrough) are on the council's outskirts.

The leisure part of Teesside Park is in the council area, including a cinema and bowling alley. Middlesbrough Leisure Park is located at the eastern edge of the town centre: it has restaurants, a cinema, a golf shop and a gym. Captain Cook Square, with the Future High Streets Fund, transitioned from majority retail sector to having a  hospitality sector; mini-golf, indoor go-kart track, e-sport venue and bowling alley.

Industry
Industry in the town was once dominated by steelmaking, shipbuilding and chemical industries. Since the late 20th century and into the 21st century, demise of much of the heavy industry in the area, newer technologies (such as the digital sector) have emerged.

Engineering 
Middlesbrough also remains a stronghold for engineering based manufacturing and engineering contract service businesses. To help support this, the new TeesAMP advanced manufacturing park is designed to accommodate businesses associated with advanced manufacturing and emerging technologies. Announced in September 2020, TeesAMP will be the location of the UK's first hydrogen transport centre.

Port

Teesport, owned by PD Ports, is a major contributor to the economy of Middlesbrough and the port owners have their offices in the town. In 2019 it handled over 4,350 vessels each year and around 27 million tonnes of cargo with the estate covering approximately 779 acres. Steel, petrochemical, agribulks, manufacturing, engineering and high street commerce operations are all supported through Teesport, in addition to the renewable energy sector, in both production and assembly facilities.

Former
In 1875, Bolckow, Vaughan & Co opened the Cleveland Steelworks in Middlesbrough, beginning the transition from iron production to steel and, by the turn of the century, the area had become one of the major steel centres in the country and possibly the world. In 1900, Bolckow, Vaughan & Co had become the largest producer of steel in Great Britain. In 1914, Dorman Long, another major steel producer from Middlesbrough, became the largest company in Britain, employing a workforce of over 20,000, and by 1929 it was the dominant steel producer on Teesside after taking over Bolckow, Vaughan & Co and acquiring its assets. It was possibly the largest steel producer in Britain at the time.

The steel components of the Sydney Harbour Bridge (1932) were engineered and fabricated by Dorman Long of Middlesbrough. The company was also responsible for the New Tyne Bridge in Newcastle.

Several large shipyards also lined the Tees, including the Sir Raylton Dixon & Company, which produced hundreds of steam freighters including the infamous SS Mont-Blanc, the steamship which caused the 1917 Halifax Explosion in Canada.

The area is still home to the nearby large Wilton International industrial site which until 1995 was largely owned by Imperial Chemical Industries (ICI). The fragmentation of that company led to smaller manufacturing units being owned by multinational organisations. The last part of ICI itself completely left the area in 2006 and the remaining companies are now members of the Northeast of England Process Industry Cluster (NEPIC).

Culture

Festivals and fairs

The Middlesbrough Mela is an annual, multi-cultural festival attracting an audience of up to 40,000 to enjoy a mix of live music, food, craft and fashion stalls. It began in Middlesbrough's Central Gardens, now Centre Square, and is either held there or in Albert Park.

Theatres and music venues
Middlesbrough also has a healthy musical heritage. A number of bands and musicians hail from the area, including Paul Rodgers, Chris Rea, and Micky Moody.

Middlesbrough Town Hall is the pre-eminent theatre venue in Middlesbrough. It has two concert halls: the first is a classic Victorian concert hall with a proscenium stage and seating 1,190; the second, under the main hall, is called the Middlesbrough Crypt and has a capacity of up to 600. The venue is run by Middlesbrough Council and is funded, in part, by Arts Council England as a National Portfolio Organisation specialising in music. It was refurbished with the assistance of the National Lottery Heritage Fund and reopened in 2018.

The Middlesbrough Theatre (formerly the Little Theatre) is in the suburb of Linthorpe. It was designed by architects Elder & De Pierro and was the first purpose designed theatre to be erected in post-war England when it was opened on 22 October 1957 by Sir John Gielgud.

Art and galleries
 
The town has three art galleries. Middlesbrough Institute of Modern Art, known locally as mima, is a purpose built contemporary art gallery which opened in January 2007. It replaced the Cleveland Gallery (closed 1999), and Cleveland Crafts Centre (closed 2003).

The Middlesbrough Art Weekender is a contemporary art festival organised by the Auxiliary that has been held in central Middlesbrough since 2017. In 2019, it was held over the weekend of 26–29 September and included the works of artists such as Emily Hesse and Karina Smigla-Bobinski. The Auxiliary Warehouse space, which was opened also as part of the 2019 Middlesbrough Art Weekender, is a recent addition to the contemporary art community. 

The Platform A Gallery is a contemporary art space at the end of platform 1 of Middlesbrough Railway Station.

Facilities

Hospitals

The South Tees Hospitals NHS Foundation Trust has the James Cook University Hospital in the town. It adds to the economy through innovative projects; such as South Tees bio-incubator which acts as a launch-pad for research, innovation and collaboration between health, technology and science. It is a facility used by GlycoSeLect (UK) Ltd. as a client of the trust in strategic partnership with The Northern Health Science Alliance which has contributed £10.8 billion to the UK economy.

Roseberry Park Hospital, operated by Tees, Esk and Wear Valleys NHS Foundation Trust (TWEV), is north of James Cook Hospital. The hospital is psychiatric orientated and replaced St Luke's Hospital. Acklam Road Hospital is operated by Cumbria, Northumberland, Tyne and Wear NHS Foundation Trust which took over from TWEV. During the transition it was renamed from West Lane to its current name.

There is also the Middlesbrough One Life Medical Centre and North Ormesby Health Village in town. Ramsey Health operate the private Tees Valley Hospital in Acklam.

Parks 

Albert Park was donated to the town by Henry Bolckow in 1866. It was formally opened by Prince Arthur on 11 August 1868, and comprises a  site. The park underwent a considerable period of restoration from 2001 to 2004, during which a number of the park's landmarks saw either restoration or revival.

Stewart Park was donated to the people of Middlesbrough in 1928 by Councillor Thomas Dormand Stewart and encompasses Victorian stable buildings, lakes and animal pens. It is also home to the Captain Cook Birthplace Museum. During 2011 and 2012, the park underwent major refurbishment. It hosted the BBC Radio 1's Big Weekend in the summer of 2019.

Newham Grange Leisure farm in the suburb of Coulby Newham has operated continuously in this spot since the 17th century, becoming a farm park and conservation centre farm with the first residential development of the suburb in the 1970s.

Libraries

There are multiple libraries serving Middlesbrough. A notable library is the Middlesbrough Central Carnegie library which dates from 1912.

Landmarks 
 there are 129 listed buildings in the council area. Acklam Hall is the only one at grade I, and 11 are at grade II*, including the town hall and the Transporter Bridge.

Buildings

The terraced Victorian streets surrounding the town centre are elements of Middlesbrough's social and historical identity, and the vast streets surrounding Parliament Road and Abingdon Road a reminder of the area's wealth and rapid growth during industrialisation.

The outer areas of the town have multiple country halls, most are of Victorian origin. Former halls include Marton Hall (on the grounds of Stewart Park), Gunnergate Hall (Coulby Newham), Tollesby Hall and Park End House. They are multiple halls that are still in existence such as Newham Hall, Nunthorpe Hall, Grey Towers, and Coulby Manor. The oldest domestic building is Acklam Hall of 1678. Built by Sir William Hustler, it is also the only Grade I listed building in Midddlesbrough. Within a mile of the council area there are Normanby Hall, Upsall Hall and the Grade I listed Ormesby Hall.

Middlesbrough Town Hall, designed by George Gordon Hoskins and built between 1883 and 1889 is a Grade II* listed building used for municipal purposes and as an entertainment venue. The Middlesbrough Empire, built in 1897 as a theatre, is a nightclub (since 1993) designed by Ernest Runtz. The first artist to perform in building as a Music Hall was Lillie Langtry. It became an early nightclub (1950s), then a bingo hall and is now once again a nightclub. In Linthorpe, is the Middlesbrough Theatre opened by Sir John Gielgud in 1957; it was one of the first new theatres built in England after the Second World War.

The Dorman Long office on Zetland Road, constructed between 1881 and 1891, is the only commercial building ever designed by Philip Webb, the architect who worked for Sir Isaac Lowthian Bell.

Bridges

Via a 1907 Act of Parliament, Sir William Arrol & Co. of Glasgow built the Tees Transporter Bridge (1911) which spans the river between Middlesbrough and Port Clarence. It is a Grade II* listed building. Some of the film Billy Elliot was filmed on the bridge. Since reopening after restoration and flood protection work in 2013 and 2015 the bridge has been closed for long periods due to safety concerns. In August 2022, the Mayor of Middlesbrough announced that one of the legs is sinking, and that the estimated costs of repairs have been increasing: the bridge's future remains under consideration. 

The Tees Newport Bridge opened further up the river in 1934. Newport bridge still stands and is passable by traffic: it formerly lifted vertically in the centre.

Artworks

The Temenos sculpture, designed by sculptor Anish Kapoor and designer Cecil Balmond, is a steel structure near to the north west side of the Riverside Stadium. The steel structure, consisting of a pole, a circular ring and an oval ring, stands approximately 110 m long and 50 m high and is held together by steel wire. It was unveiled in 2010 at a cost of £2.7 million.

Near the town hall is the "Bottle of Notes", it was unveiled in 1993 and is the UK's only public sculpture by Claes Oldenburg, it is inspired by Captain James Cook.

Transport

Road

Middlesbrough is served by public transport. Locally, Arriva North East and Stagecoach provide the majority of bus services, with National Express and Megabus operating long-distance coach travel from Middlesbrough bus station.

Middlesbrough is served by a number of major roads. The A19 (north–south) lies to the west of the town, the A66 (east–west) runs through the northern part of the town centre and the A171, A172 and A174 are other main routes linking the town. The A19 / A66 major interchange lies just to the west of the town.

Rail

 railway station is the fourth busiest in the North East England region, according to an Office of Rail and Road statistics during the 2019–20 period. It opened in 1877, at its current site, and is in the Gothic architectural style. It is the Esk Valley line's northern terminus, the Durham Coast line's southern terminus and is on the Tees Valley line.

South Bank station is in the Middlesbrough subdivision on the Tees Valley Line.

The town formerly had electric tramway services, the Middlesbrough Corporation Tramways operated the tramways between 1921 and 1934.

Paths
A trial e-scooter hire system is operating in Middlesbrough during 2020.

Education

Museums 

The Dorman Memorial Museum, which was founded by Sir Arthur Dorman and specialises in social and local history.

The Captain Cook Birthplace Museum, which was opened on 28 October 1978 in celebration of the 250th anniversary of Captain James Cook's birth in nearby Marton.

Though just outside the boundary of Middlesbrough, within a joint preservation area with Redcar and Cleveland, Ormesby Hall is an 18th-century palladian mansion, once owned by the Pennyman family; it is now a National Trust property

In July 2000 the Transporter Bridge Visitor Centre was opened to commemorate the building of the Middlesbrough Transporter Bridge.

University
Teesside University traces back to 1930 at the opening of Constantine Technical College, located on Borough Road, in the town centre. The then college expanded through acquiring adjacent buildings, such as Middlesbrough High School, and by building Middlesbrough Tower. It became Teesside Polytechnic in 1969.

In 1992, the polytechnic gained university status, becoming the University of Teesside. Extramural classes had previously been provided by the University of Leeds Adult Education Centre on Harrow Road, from 1958 to 2001. It was rebranded, in 2009,  to Teesside University. It further expanded in size and courses available, until, student numbers increased to approximately 20,000 studying at the university.
The university is a major presence in the town. It has a growing reputation for developing digital businesses particularly in the field of digital animation and for hosting the Animex festival. The Boho zone in the town now houses a large number of these start-up digital businesses. The university has 18,000 students, 2,400 staff and operates a £250,000,000 campus in Middlesbrough town-centre. The university campus has benefited from approx £250 million of investment in recent years, including the £30 million Campus Heart scheme.

Teesside University supports a total of 2,570 full-time jobs across the Tees Valley, North East and UK economies per annum. The university contributes additional wealth to the local, regional and national economies as measured by Gross Value Added (GVA). It is estimated this contributes a total of £124 million GVA per annum. The total direct, indirect and induced spending impacts associated with full-time international students and UK students from outside of the North East is approximately £18.9 million per annum. It is estimated this spending supports 158 full-time jobs per annum in Tees Valley and contributes additional wealth of £9.3 million per annum to the local economy.

Current university departments include: business, arts-and-media, computing, health-and-life-sciences, Science-and-Engineering and Social-Sciences-and-Law. In addition to teaching computer animation and games design, it co-hosts the annual Animex International Festival of Animation and Computer Games. The university has links with James Cook University Hospital in the town.

Other institutions

The town's largest college is Middlesbrough College, with 16,000 students. Others include Trinity Catholic College in Saltersgill, Macmillan Academy on Stockton Road and Askham Bryan College which has a site in Stewart Park.

The Northern School of Art (established in 1870) is also based in Middlesbrough, it has another site in Hartlepool. It is one of only four specialist art and design further education colleges in the United Kingdom.

Religion

Christianity

The Church of England Middlesbrough deanery is in the Archdeaconry of Cleveland with Stokesley (west), Guisborough (east), Whitby (south east) and Northern Ryedale (south) and Mowbray (south west). It is in the Diocese of York and Province of York.

Middlesbrough is the seat of the Roman Catholic Diocese of Middlesbrough, created on 20 December 1878 from the Diocese of Beverley. St. Mary's Cathedral is the diocese's mother church, it is in Coulby Newham as a replacement to the original St Mary's in the town centre. The present bishop is the Right Reverend Terence Patrick Drainey, 7th Bishop of Middlesbrough, who was ordained on Friday 25 January 2008. Churches of the Sacred Heart, St Bernadette's and St Clare of Assisi are also in the town.

Judaism

Ashkenazi Jews started to settle in Middlesbrough from 1862 and formed Middlesbrough Hebrew Congregation in 1870 with a synagogue in Hill Street. The synagogue moved to Brentnall Street in 1874 and then to a new building in 
Park Road South in 1938.

Editions of the Jewish Year Book record the growth and decline of Middlesbrough's Jewish population. It was about 100 in 1896–97 and peaked at 750 in 1935. It then declined to 30 in 1998, in which year the synagogue in Park Road South was ceremonially closed.

Islam

The Islamic community is represented in several mosques in Middlesbrough. Muslim sailors visited Middlesbrough from about 1890. and, in 1961, Azzam and Younis Din opened the first Halal butcher shop. The first mosque was a house in Grange Road in 1962. The Al-Madina Jamia Mosque, on Waterloo Road, the Dar ul Islam Central Mosque, on Southfield Road, and the Abu Bakr Mosque & Community Centre, which is on Park Road North.

Sikhism
The Sikh community established its first gurdwara in Milton Street in 1967. After a time in Southfield Road, the centre is now in Lorne Street and was opened in 1990.

Hinduism
There is a Hindu Cultural Centre in Westbourne Grove, North Ormesby, which was opened in 1990.

Television and filmography
Middlesbrough has featured in many television programmes, including The Fast Show, Inspector George Gently, Steel River Blues, Spender, Play for Today (The Black Stuff; latterly the drama Boys from the Blackstuff) and Auf Wiedersehen, Pet.

Film director Ridley Scott is from the North East and based the opening shot of Blade Runner on the view of the old ICI plant at Wilton. He said: "There's a walk from Redcar … I'd cross a bridge at night, and walk above the steel works. So that's probably where the opening of Blade Runner comes from. It always seemed to be rather gloomy and raining, and I'd just think "God, this is beautiful." You can find beauty in everything, and so I think I found the beauty in that darkness." It has been claimed that the site was also considered as a shooting location for one of the films in Scott's Alien franchise.

In the 2009 action thriller The Tournament Middlesbrough is that year's location where the assassins' competition is being held. In November 2009, the mima art gallery was used by the presenters of Top Gear as part of a challenge. The challenge was to see if car exhibits would be more popular than normal art.

In 2010, filmmaker John Walsh made the satirical documentary ToryBoy The Movie about the 2010 general election in the Middlesbrough constituency and sitting MP Stuart Bell's alleged laziness as an MP.

In March 2013, Middlesbrough was used as a stand in for Newcastle 1969 in BBC's Inspector George Gently starring Martin Shaw and Lee Ingleby; the footage appeared in the episode "Gently Between The Lines" (episode 1 of series 6).

Sport

Football and rugby union

Middlesbrough FC is a Championship football team, owned by local haulage entrepreneur Steve Gibson and managed by Michael Carrick. The 34,000 capacity Riverside Stadium is owned and host to home games by the club since 1995, when they left Ayresome Park. Founder members of the Premier League in 1992, Middlesbrough won the Football League Cup in 2004, and were beaten finalists in the 2005-06 UEFA Cup. In 1905, they made Britain's first £1,000 transfer when they signed Alf Common from local rivals Sunderland. Middlesbrough Ironopolis FC was briefly based in the town during the late 19th century, it later dissolved. They have players such as Riley McGree, Marcus Forss and Chuba Akpom.

Middlesbrough RUFC, founded in 1872 having have played their home games at Acklam Park since 1929, and Acklam RUFC are in Durham/ Northumberland Division One. Both are members of Yorkshire Rugby Football Union.

Racing
Middlesbrough hosts multiple road races through the year, including the annual Middlesbrough 10k (formerly Tees Pride 10k) road race. First held in 2005, the one-lap circuit event and associated fun runs were held in the Acklam area of the town before being moved to the town centre in 2021.

On 1 May 2016, Middlesbrough hosted the start of Stage 3 to the 2016 Tour de Yorkshire. The stage and race ended in Scarborough.

Other

Middlesbrough Cricket Club have played at Acklam Park since 1930 and play in North Yorkshire and South Durham Cricket League. Yorkshire have played 45 County Championship games in Middlesbrough. The most recent being in 1996.

Speedway racing was staged at Cleveland Park Stadium from 1928 until the 1990s, with the Middlesbrough Bears.

Tees Valley Mohawks and Teesside Lions basketball teams play in the NBL Division 3. Athletics has two local clubs serving Middlesbrough and the surrounding area, Middlesbrough-and-Cleveland Harriers and Middlesbrough AC (Mandale). Training facilities at the Middlesbrough Sports Village opened in 2015, replacing Clairville Stadium. Notable athletes to train at both facilities are World and European Indoor Sprint Champion Richard Kilty, British Indoor Long Jump record holder Chris Tomlinson. The sports village includes a running track with grandstand, an indoor gym and café, football pitches, as well as a cycle circuit and velodrome. Next to the sports village is a skateboard park and Middlesbrough Tennis World.

Notable people

Twinned towns
Middlesbrough is twinned with:
  Oberhausen, North Rhine-Westphalia, Germany. Middlesbrough and Oberhausen entered into a town twinning partnership in 1974, close ties having existed for over 50 years. Those ties began in 1953 with youth exchanges, the first of which was held in 1953. Both towns continue to be committed to twinning activities today.
  Dunkirk, Nord, Hauts-de-France, France Although Middlesbrough is also officially twinned with the town, twinning events have ceased.
  Masvingo, Masvingo District, Masvingo Province, Zimbabwe, since 1989

See also
 Parmo
 Zoë's Place Baby Hospice

References

Further reading
 Bell, Lady Florence. At the Works, a Study of a Manufacturing Town (1907) online.
 Briggs, Asa. Victorian Cities (1965) pp 245–82.
 Doyle, Barry. "Labour and hospitals in urban Yorkshire: Middlesbrough, Leeds and Sheffield, 1919–1938." Social history of medicine (2010): hkq007.
 Glass, Ruth. The social background of a plan: a study of Middlesbrough (1948)
 Warwick, Tosh. Central Middlesbrough through time (2013).

External links

 
 Official Middlesbrough Council Website

 
Towns in North Yorkshire
1830 establishments in England
Areas within Middlesbrough
Places in the Tees Valley
Populated places established in 1830
Port cities and towns of the North Sea
Ports and harbours of Yorkshire
Towns with cathedrals in the United Kingdom
Unparished areas in North Yorkshire